The 2011 Campeonato da 1ª Divisão do Futebol season is the 28th season of football in Macau and started on January 14 and ended June 26, 2011. Ka I were the defending champion and retained their title.

Standings

Results
Each team plays each other team twice.

Campeonato da 1ª Divisão do Futebol seasons
Macau
Macau
1